Petar Filipović (born 14 September 1990) is a German professional footballer who plays as a defender for AEL Limassol.

Club career
A product of the FC St. Pauli academy, Filipović played mostly in their reserve team, making his debut, and his only Bundesliga appearance so far on 14 May 2011, entering for Dennis Daube in a game against Mainz 05. After spending the 2011–12 season mostly in the reserve team, Filipović became a free agent, signing for Cibalia in the Prva HNL in late 2012.

On 24 June 2016, Filipović signed a three-year deal with Austria Wien. During his time in Austria, he was one of the most important members of the squad at achieving the second place in the Austrian Bundesliga and playing all six games in the groups of UEFA Europa League.

On 18 August 2017, he signed a three-year deal with Konyaspor.

International career
Filipović, who holds both Croatian and German nationality, was called up in early 2011 to the Croatia U21 national team by its selector at that time, Ivo Šušak. However, he did not answer the call, and it is alleged that the information about the call-up was withheld from him by his club.

References

External links
 
 Petar Filipović at Sportnet.hr 

1990 births
Living people
Footballers from Hamburg
German people of Croatian descent
Association football defenders
German footballers
Croatian footballers
FC St. Pauli players
HNK Cibalia players
NK Slaven Belupo players
SV Ried players
FK Austria Wien players
Konyaspor footballers
LASK players
AEL Limassol players
Bundesliga players
Croatian Football League players
Austrian Football Bundesliga players
Süper Lig players
Cypriot First Division players
Croatian expatriate footballers
German expatriate footballers
Expatriate footballers in Austria
Croatian expatriate sportspeople in Austria
German expatriate sportspeople in Austria
Expatriate footballers in Cyprus
Croatian expatriate sportspeople in Cyprus
German expatriate sportspeople in Cyprus
Expatriate footballers in Turkey
Croatian expatriate sportspeople in Turkey
German expatriate sportspeople in Turkey